= Elbessos =

Town of ancient Lycia

Coordinates: 36°41′22″N 29°38′30″E

Elbessos (Ancient Greek: Έλβησσός) was a town of ancient Lycia, which was mentioned in a treaty between Caesar and the Lycian League.

Its site is located on Girdev Gölü, Asiatic Turkey.
